Calixto García is a municipality in the Holguín Province of Cuba. The municipal seat is located in the town of Buenaventura. The municipality was named for Calixto García Iñiguez, an independence war hero.

Geography
The municipality includes the town of Buenaventura (municipal seat), the villages of Las Calabazas, Mir, Sabanazo, San Agustín, and other minor localities.

Demographics
In 2004, the municipality of Calixto Garcia had a population of 57,867.

See also
List of cities in Cuba
Municipalities of Cuba

References

External links

Populated places in Holguín Province